Wonders under Water is the English-language title of German film director Leni Riefenstahl's 1990 Wunder unter Wasser, an illustrations book of marine life.

Overview
The book is a collection of photographs taken by Riefenstahl of marine life since she began scuba diving in the 1970s.

See also
 Impressionen unter Wasser

References

1990 books
German books
Books by Leni Riefenstahl